Philip Edward Quinlan (born 17 April 1971 in Madrid) is a former professional footballer, who played as a midfielder and striker for Huddersfield Town, Everton, and Southport FC.

References

1971 births
Living people
English footballers
Sportspeople from Southport
Association football forwards
English Football League players
Huddersfield Town A.F.C. players
Everton F.C. players